Gordon Edward Taylor (July 20, 1910 – July 26, 2003) was a Canadian politician, businessman and teacher from Drumheller, Alberta.  He served as an elected official for 48 years at both the provincial and federal levels, and never lost an election. Taylor was born in Calgary.

Provincial political career
Taylor was first elected to the Legislative Assembly of Alberta in the 1940 provincial election representing Drumheller for Social Credit Party and continued to sit in the legislature for 39 years. He survived the 1971 defeat of the Social Credit government and remained in the legislature until 1979, making him the last parliamentary survivor of the Aberhart government. Taylor was Social Credit's whip from 1943 to 1950. From 1951 to 1971, he served as Minister of Highways in the governments of Ernest Manning and Harry Strom. During his tenure, 8,401 kilometers of highways were paved, and Highway 2 between Calgary and Edmonton was planned. He was also minister of telephones from 1950 to 1959. While a Member of the Legislative Assembly (MLA) during World War II, he also served with the Royal Canadian Air Force.

Taylor ran twice for the party leadership, coming in second to Strom in the 1968 leadership election to replace Manning and coming in third in the 1973 leadership race.

As an opposition MLA in the 1970s, Taylor broke with Social Credit over his support for the Lougheed government's plan to provide gasoline to farmers, a measure the Social Credit party opposed. Taylor also felt the Social Credit caucus was "moving to the left" and was supporting the federal Liberals. As a result, in 1975, Taylor left the Social Credit caucus and sat as an Independent Social Credit MLA supporting Peter Lougheed. He was re-elected as such in the 1975 provincial election. He continued to support the Lougheed government during his last term in the legislature, planned to cross the floor to join the Progressive Conservatives on the last day before the legislature was dissolved in 1979, and then run as a Progressive Conservative in the 1979 provincial election.

Federal political career
Early in 1979, Taylor was approached to run for the House of Commons of Canada as a Progressive Conservative candidate in the 1979 federal election in Bow River, which included Drumheller. He challenged incumbent Tory MP Stanley Schumacher for the PC nomination—the real contest in this strongly conservative riding. Schumacher had refused to step aside for party leader Joe Clark, whose riding was being merged with Schumacher's as a result of redistribution. After Clark decided to run in another riding, Taylor defeated Schumacher for the party nomination, and then in the federal election when Schumacher stood as an independent candidate. Taylor remained in parliament until he retired at the 1988 federal election.

Taylor became known for hosting an annual hockey game between the Members of Parliament and the House of Commons Pages.

References

External links
Legislative Assembly of Alberta Members Listing
 

|-

1910 births
2003 deaths
Progressive Conservative Party of Canada MPs
Members of the House of Commons of Canada from Alberta
Alberta Social Credit Party MLAs
Independent Alberta MLAs
Progressive Conservative Association of Alberta MLAs
Members of the Executive Council of Alberta